Wellsville Junior/Senior High School is a public high school in Wellsville, Ohio, United States.  It is the only high school in the Wellsville Local School District. Athletic teams compete as the Wellsville Tigers in the Ohio High School Athletic Association as a member of the Eastern Ohio Athletic Conference as well as the Ohio Valley Athletic Conference.

History
In  the  early 1850s, the  state  of  Ohio  passed  a  law  making  school  attendance  mandatory, which  led  to  the construction  of  the  Union  High  School  building  on  6th and  Washington  Streets. The Central High School building was constructed in 1875 under longtime superintendent James  L.  MacDonald. This  building accommodated all  students  in grades one through twelve for a time.

The gymnasium was constructed alongside the school and named Beacom Gymnasium after Bryron D. Beacom. At that time, the annex cost $100,000 and was dedicated in 1939. It served students  in  grades  seven  and  eight,  along  with special education students and was named Daw Junior High in honor of the superintendent. A successful  levy  was  passed  in  1996  for  the  school  district which led to the construction of a new high school which opened in 2001. Seventh grade was moved back to Daw Elementary School in 2017.

Academics
According to the National Center for Education Statistics, in 2019, the school reported an enrollment of 250 pupils in grades 8th through 12th, with 247 pupils eligible for a federal free or reduced-price lunch. The school employed 23.00 teachers, yielding a student–teacher ratio of 10.87.

Wellsville Senior High School offers courses in the traditional American curriculum.

Entering their third and fourth years, students can elect to attend the Columbiana County Career and Technical Center in Lisbon as either a part time student, taking core courses at Wellsville, while taking career or technical education at the career center, or as a full time student instead. Students may choose to take training in automotives, construction technology, cosmetology, culinary arts, health sciences, information technology, multimedia, landscape & environmental design, precision machining, veterinary science, and welding.

A student must earn 28 credits to graduate, including: 4 credits in a mathematics sequence, 3 credits in science, including life and physical science, 4 credits in English, 3 credits in a social studies sequence, 1 credit in fine art, 1 credit in health and physical education, 1 credit in personal finance, and 4.5 elective credits. Elective courses can be in English, science, social studies, foreign language, technology and business, family and consumer science, and fine art. Students attending the career center follow the same basic requirements, but have requirements in career & technical education rather than fine arts. All students must pass Ohio state exams in English I & II, Algebra I, Geometry, Biology, American History, and American Government, or the like.

Athletics
The following is an alphabetical list of sports offered by the high school.
Basketball
Bowling
Football
Softball
Soccer
Track & Field
Volleyball
Wrestling

The 1994 Wellsville football team reached the OHSAA Division V State Championship, but lost to Versailles High School.

The 2013 Wellsville football team won their first home playoff game in school history 39-21 over Ashland Mapleton.

Notable alumni
Bevo Francis - Professional basketball player who held the NCAA scoring record from 1954 to 2012
Chris Regan - Former Major League Baseball player for the Tampa Bay Rays

References

http://images.pcmac.org/Uploads/WellsvilleLocal/WellsvilleLocal/Sites/News/Documents/Wellsville_Schools_History.pdf

External links
 District Website
 Wellsville HS Soccer Website

High schools in Columbiana County, Ohio
Public high schools in Ohio